Andalusi Romance, also called Mozarabic, refers to the varieties of Ibero-Romance spoken in Al-Andalus, the parts of the medieval Iberian Peninsula under Islamic control. Romance, or vernacular Latin, was the common tongue for the majority of the population in the wake of the Umayyad conquest in the early eighth century. Over the following centuries, Andalusi Arabic gradually spread and eventually superseded Andalusi Romance as the main spoken language in the Muslim-controlled south. Castilian, an anomalous form of Ibero-Romance, expanded over other varieties of Romance as the Christian kingdoms gained territory in Iberia. The final disappearance of Andalusi Romance dates to around the thirteenth century.

Aside from Castilian, the varieties of medieval Ibero-Romance, in both Islamic and Christian lands, were linguistically similar. Andalusi Romance is not distinguished from other Ibero-Romance varieties by its linguistic structure, but it is unique in that it was recorded primarily with Arabic script. What is known or hypothesized of the particular linguistic features of Andalusi Romance is based on relatively sparse evidence, of which the Kharjas are the most important.

Names
The traditional term for the Romance varieties used in al-Andalus is "Mozarabic," derived from Mozarab, (from the ) a term used to refer to Christians in al-Andalus. 

Some scholars dislike the term for its ambiguity. According to Consuelo Lopez-Morillas:it has been objected that the term straddles ambiguously the realms of religion and language, and further implies, erroneously, that the dialect was spoken only by Christians. The very form of the word suggests (again a false perception) that it denotes a language somehow related to Arabic.To describe the varieties of Romance in al-Andalus, Spanish scholars are increasingly using  (from the ), or Andalusi Romance in English.

Speakers of Andalusi Romance, like speakers of Romance anywhere else on the peninsula, would have described their spoken language simply as "ladino," i.e. Latin. The term Ladino has since come to refer to the specialized sense of Judeo-Spanish. Arab writers used the terms al-Lathinī or al-'ajamīya (from ʿajam, 'non-Arab').

History 
Romance, or vernacular Latin, was the main language spoken by the population of Iberia when the Umayyads conquered Hispania in 711. Over the centuries, Arabic spread gradually in Iberia, primarily through conversion to Islam. While Alvarus of Cordoba lamented in the 9th century that Christians were no longer using Latin, Richard Bulliet estimates that only 50% of the population of al-Andalus had converted to Islam by the death of Abd al-Rahman III in 961, and 80% by 1100. By about 1260, Muslim territories in Iberia were reduced to the Emirate of Granada, in which more than 90% of the population had converted to Islam and Arabic-Romance bilingualism seems to have disappeared.

Archival record 
What is known or hypothesized of the particular linguistic features of Andalusi Romance is based on relatively sparse evidence, including Romance topographical and personal names, legal documents from the Mozarabs of Toledo, names in botanical texts, occasional isolated romance words in the zajal poetry of Ibn Quzman, and Pedro de Alcalá's Vocabulista.

The Kharjas 
The discovery in the late 1940s of the Kharjas, refrains in Romance in muwashshah poetry in Arabic and Hebrew, illuminated some morphological and syntactic features of Andalusi Romance, including sentence rhythms and phrasal patterns.

Influences 
Other than the obvious Arabic influence, and remnants of a pre-Roman substratum, early Mozarabic may also have been affected by African Romance, carried over to the Iberian Peninsula by the Berbers who made up most of the Islamic army that conquered it and remained prominent in the Andalusi administration and army for centuries to come. The possible interaction between these two Romance varieties has yet to be investigated.

Language use
Mozarabic was spoken by Mozarabs (Christians living as dhimmis), Muladis (natives converted to Islam), Jews, and possibly some of the ruling Arabs and Berbers. The cultural and literary language of the Mozarabs was at first Latin, but as time passed, it came to rather be Arabic, even among Christians.

Due to the continual emigration of Mozarabs to the Christian kingdoms of the north, Arabic toponyms are found even in places where Arab rule was ephemeral.

Mozarabic had a significant impact on the formation of Spanish, especially Andalusian Spanish, and served as a vehicle for the transmission of numerous Andalusi Arabic terms into both.

Scripts
Because Mozarabic was not a language of higher culture, such as Latin or Arabic, it had no standard writing-system. Numerous Latin documents written by early Mozarabs are, however, extant.

The bulk of surviving material in Mozarabic is found in the choruses (or kharjas) of Andalusi lyrical compositions known as muwashshahs, which were otherwise written in Arabic. The script used to write the Mozarabic kharjas was invariably Arabic or Hebrew, less often the latter. This poses numerous problems for modern scholars attempting to interpret the underlying Mozarabic. Namely:

 Arabic script:
 did not reliably indicate vowels
 relied on diacritical points, quite often lost or distorted when copying manuscripts, to distinguish the following series of consonants: b-t-ṯ-n-y; ğ-ḥ-ḫ; d-ḏ; r-z; s-s̆; ṣ-ḍ; ṭ-ẓ; '-ġ; f-q; and h-a (word-finally)
 rendered the following consonants in similar ways: r-w-d, ḏ; '-l-k (word-initially); ', ġ-f, q-m (word-initially and medially); n-y (word-finally)
 had no specific means to indicate the following Romance sounds: /p, v (β), ts, dz, s̺, z̺, tʃ, ʎ, ɲ, e, o/
 Hebrew script:
 also did not reliably indicate vowels
 rendered the following consonants in similar ways: r-d; g-n; y-w; k-f; s-m (word-finally)

The overall effect of this, combined with the rampant textual corruption, is that modern scholars can freely substitute consonants and insert vowels to make sense of the kharjas, leading to considerable leeway, and hence inaccuracy, in interpretation.

Phonological features
It is widely agreed that Mozarabic had the following features:

 The diphthongs /au̯, ai̯/, the latter possibly changed to /ei̯/
 Diphthongization of stressed Latin /ŏ, ĕ/
 Palatalization and affrication of Latin /k/ before front vowels to /tʃ/
 Retention of Latin /j/ before front vowels
 Shift of the feminine plural /-as/ to /-es/

The following two features remain a matter of debate, largely due to the ambiguity of the Arabic script:

 Lenition of intervocalic Latin /p t k s/ to /b d ɡ z/
 Much of the controversy over the voicing of Latin  has centered on the Arabic letters Qāf and Ṭāʾ, which in fact had both voiced and voiceless pronunciations in different varieties of Arabic. It is likely that both pronunciations were found in the Iberian Peninsula.
 Ramón Menéndez Pidal has shown (sporadic) evidence of voicing in Latin inscriptions from the south of the Iberian Peninsula in the second century AD.
 Palatalization of Latin /nn, ll/ to /ɲ, ʎ/

Sample text 
Presented below is one of the few kharjas whose interpretation is secure from beginning to end. It has been transcribed from a late thirteen-century copy in Hebrew script, but it is also attested (in rather poor condition) in an Arabic manuscript from the early twelfth century.

Another kharja is presented below, transcribed from Arabic script by García Gómez:

However the above kharja, like most others, presents numerous textual difficulties. Below is Jones' transcription of it, with vowels inserted and uncertain readings italicized. Note the discrepancies.

See also 
Aljamiado
Mozarabs
Mozarabic Rite
Mozarabic art and architecture
Andalusian Arabic
History of Spain

Notes

References

Bibliography
Corriente Córdoba, Federico & Sáenz-Badillos, Ángel. 1994. Nueva propuesta de lectura de las xarajât de la serie árabe con texto romance. Revista de filología española 73 (3–4). 283–289.
Craddock, Jerry R. 1980. The language of the Mozarabic jarchas. UC Berkeley: Research Center for Romance Studies.
 
 
García Gómez, Emilio. 1965. Las jarchas romances de la serie árabe en su marco. Madrid: Sociedad de Estudios y Publicaciones.
Gil, Juan. 1973. Corpus scriptorum muzarabicorum. 2 vols. Madrid: CSIC.
Jones, Alan. 1988. Romance kharjas in Andalusian Arabic muwaššaḥ poetry. London: Ithaca Press.
Marcos-Marín, Francisco A. 1998. Romance andalusí y mozárabe: Dos términos no sinónimos. In Andrés Suárez, Irene & López Molina, Luis (eds.), Estudios de Lingüística y Filología Españolas: Homenaje a Germán Colón. 335–341. Madrid: Gredos. 
Marcos Marín, Francisco. 2015. Notas sobre los bereberes, el afrorrománico y el romance andalusí. Hesperia: Culturas del Mediterráneo 19. 203–222.
Menéndez Pidal, Ramón. 2005. Historia de la lengua española. 2 vols. Madrid: Fundación Ramón Menendez Pidal. 
 
Wright, Roger. 1982. Late Latin and Early Romance in Spain and Carolingian France. Liverpool: Francis Cairns. 

language
Medieval languages
Pyrenean-Mozarabic languages
Extinct Romance languages
Culture of Al-Andalus
language
Extinct languages of Spain
Languages of Portugal